Bukbu Expressway is a highway located in Seoul and Gyeonggi Province, South Korea.

History

This route was established on 10 May 1997.

Stopovers
 Seoul
 Seongbuk District - Nowon District - Jungnang District
 Gyeonggi Province
 Guri - Namyangju

List of Facilities 
IC : 나들목(Interchange)
JC : 분기점(Junction)
BR : 교량(Bridge)
(■) : Motorway section

References

1997 establishments in South Korea
Roads in Seoul
Roads in Gyeonggi